David Kaminsky (דוד קמינסקי; born January 8, 1938) is an Israeli former basketball player and coach. He played the guard position. Kaminsky played in the Israel Basketball Premier League, and for the Israel national basketball team.

Biography

Kaminsky is 1.83 m (6 ft 0 in) tall. He grew up in Jerusalem, and enlisted in the Israel Defense Forces in 1956, and was in the 4th Battalion. He also worked as a bus driver, for a company that later merged with Egged.

Kaminsky played 14 seasons in the Israel Basketball Premier League for Hapoel Jerusalem, Hapoel Tel Aviv, and Betar Jerusalem. He also coached Maccabi Jerusalem, Hapoel Jerusalem, and Betar Jerusalem.

He played 88 games on the Israel national basketball team. Kaminsky competed for it in the 1959 European Championship for Men, 1961 European Championship for Men, 1965 European Championship for Men, 1966 Asian Games (winning a gold medal), 1967 European Championship for Men, 1959 European Championship for Men, and 1969 European Championship for Men.

Kaminsky worked in the insurance business after his retirement. He and his wife now live in Motza Illit in central Israel.

References 

Living people
1938 births
20th-century Israeli military personnel
Israeli men's basketball players
Israeli basketball coaches
Hapoel Jerusalem B.C. players
Hapoel Jerusalem B.C. coaches
Hapoel Tel Aviv B.C. players
Israeli Basketball Premier League players
Sportspeople from Jerusalem
Jews in Mandatory Palestine
Asian Games medalists in basketball
Basketball players at the 1966 Asian Games
Asian Games gold medalists for Israel
Medalists at the 1966 Asian Games
Businesspeople in insurance